This article gives an overview of liberalism in Albania. It is limited to liberal parties with substantial support, mainly proved by having had a representation in parliament. The sign ⇒ denotes another party in that scheme. For inclusion in this scheme it isn't necessary so that parties labeled themselves as a liberal party.

History
A form of radical liberalism was dominant shortly after independence, but became oppressed. After the restoration of democracy in the 1990s, liberalism was and is only a weak political factor. Two parties could be considered to embrace liberal values: the Democratic Alliance Party (Partia Aleanca Demokratike, member LI, ELDR) and the Unity for Human Rights Party (Partia Bashkimi për të Drejtat e Njeriut), which is the party of the ethnic minorities.

Democratic Party
1924: The democratic faction of the Popular Party (Partia Popullore), led by Stylian Fan Noli seceded and established the liberal Democratic Party (Parti Demokratike).
1924: The party is banned by the dictatorship

Democratic Alliance Party
1992: A liberal faction of the conservative Democratic Party of Albania (Partia Demokratike e Shqipërisë) seceded to form the present-day Democratic Alliance Party (Partia Aleanca Demokratike)

Liberal leaders
 Stylian Fan Noli

See also
 History of Albania
 Politics of Albania
 List of political parties in Albania

Albania
Politics of Albania